Ys Strategy is a 2006 real-time strategy video game. A part of the Ys series, it was developed by Future Creates and published by Marvelous Interactive in Japan and Rising Star Games in Europe and Australia.

Reception

The game received "mixed" reviews according to video game review aggregator Metacritic. In Japan, Famitsu gave it a score of one six, one five, and two sevens, for a total of 25 out of 40.

References

External links
Rising Star Games website
Official website 

2006 video games
Nintendo DS games
Nintendo DS-only games
Real-time strategy video games
Single-player video games
Video games developed in Japan
Ys (series)
Rising Star Games games